NADH-ubiquinone oxidoreductase may refer to:

 NADH dehydrogenase
 NADH:ubiquinone reductase (non-electrogenic)